Power Racing Series is a non-profit power wheels racing competition. It's modeled after the racing series 24 Hours of LeMons however with child sized electric cars. The power racing series competitions are held at Maker Faire events across the USA.

About
Power Racing series is a racing competition where teams build a $500 Power Wheel (Or any electric kids’ ride on vehicle.) and modify it to go as fast as it can.

History
Jim Burke launched the Power Racing Series.  The first season in 2009 consisted of six cars, all backed by other Pumping Station: One members. The second season in 2010 was hosted at the Detroit Maker Faire with competitors from several hackerspaces throughout the country.

Involvement in notable events

Competitions 
WEST
 San Mateo, CA - Maker Faire Bay Area
 Kansas City, MO - Maker Faire Kansas City

CENTRAL
 Detroit, MI - Maker Faire Detroit
 Milwaukee, WI - Maker Faire Milwaukee

EAST
 Pittsburgh, PA - Maker Faire Pittsburgh
 New York, NY - World Maker Faire New York

SOUTH
 Nashville, TN - Nashville Mini Maker Faire
 Atlanta, GA - Maker Faire Atlanta
 Orlando, FL - Maker Faire Orlando

References

External links
Official Pumping Station: One website
Vimby video overview of Pumping Station: One
Power Racing Series
GeekProm Chicago
Hackers of the world unite | Guardian.co.uk
Interview with Eric Michaud
Charcoal foundry build at Chicago hackerspace
Hackerspace at Pumping Station 1: Will the Arts Go Open Source?
Innovative technology and teamwork that results in hilarious crashing. | Hot Rod Magazine

Hacker groups
Computer clubs
Hackerspaces